The KTM 500 EXC is one model in the series of 4-stroke enduro off-road motorcycle made by KTM. They are essentially the 400/450 EXCs with changes to the stroke to achieve larger displacements. The 520, 525, 530 and 500 are all in fact 510.4 cc motors given different model numbers to distinguish them. Like the other KTM enduro offerings they vary in the set-up and components. The international EXC versions have a small headlight, speedometer, tail-light and somewhat softer linkless (PDS) rear suspension. 2007 was the first year the EXC was deemed street legal in the US. As of 2008 the US version of the EXC, with the new XC-4 motor, continued to be sold in street legal trim. In 2012 the US 50-states street legal 530 EXC-R was rebadged the 500 EXC. In mid 2016  the 2017 bikes were introduced adding a 250cc version. It joins the 350 and 500 EXC-F.

Model progression

500 CC class Enduro Bikes

The KTM 500 EXC (2012–present) is a 50 state street legal dual-sport enduro dirtbike powered by a 510 cc SOHC engine.

References

500 EXC
Dual-sport motorcycles